Bahu-Jholri is a village in Rewari district in the Indian state of Haryana. Jholri is a village situated on MDR 130 in Rewari district. However the word Bahu (Jholri) contains the name of two villages, one is Bahu and the other is Jholri, their names combined in the form of one name because of many Bahu villages in Haryana. These two villages are neighbour villages. A few years ago both villages were Jhajjar district, but  now Bahu is in Jhajjar district and Jholri is in Rewari district. Khanpur Khurd (3 km), Jharli railway station (7 km), Khanpur Kalan (3 km), Jhamri (7 km), Mohanbari (7 km), Dhalanwas (10 km) are the nearby villages to Bahu. Bahu is surrounded by Kanina Tehsil to the south, Salhawas Tehsil to the east, and Dadri-I Tehsil to the north. This village is on the border of Jhajjar District.

The village Bahu is populated mainly by Jaat, Ahir,Thakore, and Baniya castes. The history of Bahu village is that, in this village Muslims lived for many years before the independence of India. At the time of independence when Hindustan and Pakistan were separated the Muslims moved to Pakistan by selling everything at extremely low prices.

In Bahu there are lot of temples - one of them is Baba gudariya temple as people generally went in this temple on Sunday and many other nice temples are there and there is a very big Maszid of Muslims situated near the main market and girls government school. Muslims used to come in numbers at their festivals. This village was the only village which consisted of a boys' school and a girls' school until Tenth class at that time in all nearby areas and now we have a big girls college which is fully Air conditioner.

The district of this village was changed several times. First at the formation of Haryana state it was in Rohtak District, then it was changed to Gurgaon District, then it was changed back to Rohtak, and when Jhajjar District was formed from Rohtak it moved to Rewari District, then on the request of the villagers of village Bahu and Goriya it was moved to the Jhajjar District. This village is about 40 km from Jhajjar. Now this village is in the form of a Town and acts as a center of market for the nearby villages.

One of the most interesting thing about this village is all the caste exists in this village and ratio of educated people is high. if want to visit this village then you should go to Sani Madir, Bada Gudarya and Prashuram Mandir they are the point of attraction in our village and must watch Ramleela that perform by local villagers at the time of Diwali. Nearby these is a famous Dharamshala and Marriage  Hall which serves as an assembly point for this village  and adjoining  villages. 

By Maninder punia

See also                                                                                                                                                                                                                                                                                                         
 Kosli
 Kanina khas
 Rewari
 Karoli, Rewari
 Mahendragarh

Villages in Rewari district